Jesse James Brown (June 6, 1914 – May 25, 1980) was an American Negro league pitcher between 1938 and 1944.

A native of Cleveland, Ohio, Brown made his Negro leagues debut in 1938 with the Newark Eagles. He went on to play for the New York Black Yankees and Baltimore Elite Giants. Brown died in Wellesley, Massachusetts in 1980 at age 65.

References

External links
 and Seamheads

1914 births
1980 deaths
Baltimore Elite Giants players
New York Black Yankees players
Newark Eagles players
20th-century African-American sportspeople
Baseball pitchers